Golczowice may refer to the following places:
Golczowice, Lesser Poland Voivodeship (south Poland)
Golczowice, Brzeg County in Opole Voivodeship (south-west Poland)
Golczowice, Prudnik County in Opole Voivodeship (south-west Poland)